The Santa Rosa Storm occurs in the Southern Hemisphere up to fifteen days earlier than or fifteen days later than the festival of Santa Rosa of Lima, Perú, celebrated on August 30 each year. 

Legend has it that Isabel Flores de Oliva, also known as Rosa de Lima,  caused a mighty storm which prevented Dutch pirates from attacking the city of Lima in 1615. However, meteorologists attribute the storm to the clash of the first warm winds, which are a product of the arrival of spring with cold fronts.  

The legend is very popular in Argentina and Uruguay, especially around the Rio de la Plata area (including Buenos Aires and Montevideo) and the Argentinian province of Córdoba and the Cuyo region, west of Buenos Aires.

Myth and reality

Climate data show that the storm is one of the first to form at the end of Southern winter, some 10 days before August 20 and September 20.

In popular belief, the Santa Rosa storm is one of the most violent of the year. However, reality is different. For the City of Buenos Aires (according to the Villa Ortúzar SMN Observatory), the storm has only appeared five days before or after the 30 August on sixteen occasions since 1861. However, showers are frequent in this period, which helps keep the myth alive. 

Of the sixteen storms, seven have occurred since 1992, probably owing to global warming.

References 
Tormenta de Santa Rosa
La tormenta de Santa Rosa llega hoy y termina el calor (The Santa Rosa Storm arrives today and the heatwave ends) 30 August 2009, Clarin

Storms
Weather events in South America
Uruguayan folklore
Argentine folklore
Peruvian folklore